Sinilabeo binhluensis is a species of cyprinid of the genus Sinilabeo. It inhabits Vietnam and is considered harmless to humans. It has been assessed as "data deficient" by the IUCN Red List.

References

Cyprinid fish of Asia
IUCN Red List data deficient species
Fish of Vietnam
Fish described in 2001